Arsha can be a female given name of Persian or Indian origins. 

Arsha may refer to:

 Arsha (community development block)
 Arsha Assembly constituency
 Arsha College
 Arsha Ovanesova
 Arsha prayoga
 Arsha, Purulia
 Arsha Vidya Gurukulam

See also 
 Arshad (disambiguation)
 Asha, Zoroastrian divinity